Ciruelos  is a municipality located in the province of Toledo, Castile-La Mancha, Spain. According to the 2014 census, the municipality has a population of 611 inhabitants.

It was a filming location for the 1976 horror film Who Can Kill a Child?.

References

External links

 auto

Municipalities in the Province of Toledo